The FN 140DA - also known as  Browning BDA 380 - was a semi-automatic weapon produced by both FN Herstal of Belgium and Beretta of Italy.

Overview
The production of this pistol design started in 1976. The new model was to replace the FN 1922/Browning 125 in the company's line-up. The pistol is a derivative of Beretta Model 81 and/or 84, distinguished by a closed cylinder head and a different safety system.

It was available in .32 ACP and .380 ACP, with the .32 ACP variant manufactured by FN Herstal for European markets while Beretta manufactured the .380 ACP variants at their own factories on behalf of FN Herstal.

However, Beretta did not sell these pistols under its own brand. Instead, the .380 variants by Beretta were sold as Browning BDA 380 by Browning Arms Company for the North American markets. The Beretta/Browning model is distinguished by its markings, with the right side of the slide being marked "Fabrique National Herstal" with the FN logo followed by "Made in Italy", and the left side of the slide bearing the marking "Browning Arms Co. Morgan Utah & Montreal, P.Q."

It failed commercially, despite some purchases by the Belgian Judicial Police for female officers. The production of the FN 140DA pistol was discontinued in 1987, while Beretta/Browning version was withdrawn in circa 1997.

Design
The FN 140DA/Browning BDA 380 is a semi-automatic firearm. The principle of operation is based on the recoil of the free lock. Self-cocking valve trigger mechanism.

The frame is aluminum but the slide is steel.  The handgrips are wood. The BDA 380 like the larger versions features a double/single action trigger mechanism. The magazine capacity in .380 ACP is 13 rounds.

Adjustable fuse. Fuse wing on the left side of the lock. After firing the last round, the slide stops in the rear position. The outer latch is located on the upper left side of the grip.

The FN 140DA is fed from a removable, two-row box magazine with a capacity of 13 (7.65 mm) or 12 (9 mm) cartridges, placed in the grip. The magazine release button is located behind the trigger guard.

The 140DA comes with a threaded barrel. Mechanical, fixed sights (front sight and rear sight).

Users
 : Belgian Judicial Police (for female officers) circa 1980.

See also
 Beretta Cheetah

Notes
1.Production of Browning 125 ended in 1980

References

External links
 Browning BDA 380 users manual

.380 ACP semi-automatic pistols
Browning Arms Company
Beretta firearms